The following is a tabulation of United States military casualties of war.

Overview
Note: "Total casualties" includes wounded, combat and non-combat deaths but not missing in action. "Deaths – other" includes all non-combat deaths including those from bombing, massacres, disease, suicide, and murder.

Wars ranked by U.S. combat deaths

Wars ranked by total number of U.S. military deaths

"Deaths per day" is the total number of Americans killed in military service, divided by the number of days between the dates of the commencement and end of hostilities.  "Deaths per population" is the total number of deaths in military service, divided by the U.S. population of the year indicated.

Notes
a.  Revolutionary War: All figures from the Revolutionary War are rounded estimates. Commonly cited casualty figures provided by the Department of Defense are 4,435 killed and 6,188 wounded, although the original government report that generated these numbers warned that the totals were incomplete and far too low. In 1974, historian Howard Peckham and a team of researchers came up with a total of 6,824 killed in action and 8,445 wounded. Because of incomplete records, Peckham estimated that this new total number of killed in action was still about 1,000 too low. Military historian John Shy subsequently estimated the total killed in action at 8,000, and argued that the number of wounded was probably far higher, about 25,000. The "other" deaths are primarily from disease, including prisoners who died on British prison ships.

b.  Other Actions Against Pirates: Includes actions fought in the West Indies, the Greek Isles, off of Louisiana, China and Vietnam.  Other deaths resulted from disease and accidents.

c.  Civil War: All Union casualty figures, and Confederate killed in action, from The Oxford Companion to American Military History except where noted (NPS figures). estimate of total Confederate dead from James M. McPherson, Battle Cry of Freedom (Oxford University Press, 1988), 854. Newer estimates place the total death toll at 650,000 to 850,000. 148 of the Union dead were U.S. Marines.
ca.  Civil War April 2, 2012 Doctor David Hacker after extensive research offered new casualty rates higher by 20%; his work has been accepted by the academic community and is represented  here.

d.  World War I figures include expeditions in North Russia and Siberia. See also World War I casualties

da. World War II Note: as of March 31, 1946 there were an estimated 286,959 dead of whom 246,492 were identified; of 40,467 who were unidentified 18,641 were located {10,986 reposed in military cemeteries and 7,655 in isolated graves} and 21,826 were reported not located. As of April 6, 1946 there were 539 American Military Cemeteries which contained 241,500 dead. Note the American Battle Monuments Commission database for the World War II reports that in 18 ABMC Cemeteries total of 93,238 buried and 78,979 missing and that "The World War II database on this web site contains the names of those buried at our cemeteries, or listed as Missing in Action, buried or lost at sea. It does not contain the names of the 233,174 Americans returned to the United States for burial..." Similarly, the ABMC Records do not cover inter-war deaths such as the Port Chicago disaster in which 320 died. As of June 2018 total of US World War II casualties listed as MIA is 72,823

e.  Korean War: Note: gives Dead as 33,746 and Wounded as 103, 284 and MIA as 8,177. The American Battle Monuments Commission database for the Korean War reports that "The Department of Defense reports that 54,246 American service men and women lost their lives during the Korean War. This includes all losses worldwide. Since the Korean War Veterans Memorial in Washington, D.C. honors all U.S. Military who lost their lives during the War, we have tried to obtain the names of those who died in other areas besides Korea during the period June 27, 1950 to July 27, 1954, one year after the Korean Armistice...". {For a breakdown of Worldwide casualties of 54,246 see The Korean War educator at  gives figures as In-theatre/non theater}
After their retreat in 1950, dead Marines and soldiers were buried at a temporary gravesite near Hungnam, North Korea. During "Operation Glory" which occurred from July to November 1954 the dead of each side were exchanged; remains of 4,167 US soldiers/Marines were exchanged for 13,528 North Korean/Chinese dead. After "Operation Glory" 416 Korean War "unknowns" were buried in the Punchbowl Cemetery. According to a DPMO white paper. 1,394 names were also transmitted during "Operation Glory" from the Chinese and North Koreans, of whom 858 names proved to be correct; of the 4,167 returned remains were found to be 4,219 individuals of whom 2,944 were found to be Americans of whom all but 416 were identified by name. Of 239 Korean War unaccounted for: 186 not associated with Punchbowl unknowns (176 were identified and of the remaining 10 cases 4 were non-Americans of Asiatic descent; one was British; 3 were identified and 2 cases unconfirmed); Of 10 Korean War "Punchbowl Unknowns" 6 were identified. The W.A. Johnson listing of 496 POWsincluding 25 civilianswho died in North Korea can be found here and there

Listed as MIA: 7,683

ea.  Cold War – Korea and Vietnam and Middle East-additional US Casualties:
 North Korea {Cold War} 1959: 1968–69; 1976; 1984 killed 41; Wounded 5; 82 captured/released.
 USS Liberty incident 1967 killed 34; Wounded 173 by Israeli armed forces
 Vietnam War prior to 1964-US Casualties were Laos – 2 killed in 1954; and Vietnam 1946–1954 – 2 killed see;

f.  Iraq War. See also Casualties of the Iraq War. Sources:
.

g.  Afghanistan. Casualties include those that occurred in Pakistan, Uzbekistan, Djibouti, Eritrea, Ethiopia, Guantanamo Bay (Cuba), Jordan, Kenya, Kyrgyzstan, Philippines, Seychelles, Sudan, Tajikistan, Turkey, and Yemen.

See also
 Military history of the United States
 World War II casualties

References

External links 
 American War and Military Operations Casualties: Lists and Statistics Congressional Research Service
 Louisiana State University's statistical summary of major American wars
 Washington Post database of all U.S. service-member casualties 
 CNN list of U.S. Casualties in Iraq since 2003.
 Complete list of U.S. Casualties in Iraq and Afghanistan since 2003.
 Iraq Casualties
 Navy and Marine death tolls
  Iraq and Afghanistan Casualty Count

 
Wars involving the United States
United States military-related lists